Neville Anderson (born 18 July 1947) known professionally as Andy Anderson and also billed as Andy James, is a New Zealand musician and actor who worked a lot in Australia. As a musician he is best known as the lead singer of 1960s band The Missing Links, and as an actor he is well known for his roles on both Australian and New Zealand television.

Music career
Anderson who was born in Naenae, Lower Hutt, near Wellington performed in several well-known Australian rock bands of the 1960s, in 1965 he joined the second lineup of famed Sydney garage punk group the Missing Links as lead vocalist, and he performed on the group's only album. After the demise of the Links, he moved to Melbourne and joined another radical punk-R&B outfit, Running Jumping Standing Still, which also included lead guitarist Doug Ford, who subsequently joined the Masters Apprentices. He sang with the avant-garde theatre group Red Mole for a time. 

Anderson was well known for his outrageous stage performances but his wild lifestyle at the time took a heavy toll and in late 1966 he was hospitalised after suffering a brain haemorrhage onstage at Melbourne's Thumpin' Tum discothèque. After his recovery, Anderson formed two short-lived Melbourne bands, Andy James Asylum, followed by Mother Superior, before moving back to Sydney, where he joined the cast of the Australian production of Hair for a short time during 1970. This was followed by an 18-month stint with Sydney club band Southern Comfort, with co-vocalist Bobbi Marchini.

In 2019 age 71 he was writing, and making music based in Palmerston North, New Zealand.

Film and television
After moving overseas for some time (reputedly to evade a death threat made by a Sydney underworld figure) Anderson returned to Australia and began performing regularly on Australian TV from the mid-1970s, with appearances in The Sullivans (as Jim Sullivan), Gloss (as Matt Winter), Prisoner (as Rick Manning), Fire (as John Kennedy) and a starring role in the talking-dog sitcom The Bob Morrison Show as Steve Morrison.

Guest appearances on television include: The Flying Doctors, Halifax f.p., A Country Practice, Xena: Warrior Princess, Hercules: The Legendary Journeys, Heartbreak High, Water Rats, All Saints, Blue Heelers, Neighbours and Stingers.

He had a prominent featured role as detective Lochie Renford in the first season of the acclaimed ABC-TV police series Phoenix (1992–93). In 2012 he had a recurring featured role as Vince, the minder of drug lord Harry Montebello, in the ABC-TV crime drama series The Straits.

On film, he is known for playing the role as John Livingston in the film Anacondas: The Hunt for the Blood Orchid and also starred in House of Wax and Tracker (2010).

Selected filmography

Music
Anderson returned to music in the 2000s, recording an album called If I'd Known I'd Live This Long..., and he participated in a reunion of Southern Comfort in Sydney in 2003.

Awards
2000 Australian Film Institute Awards- Best Performance by an Actor in a Tele-Feature or Mini-Series: Halifax f.p.- A Person of Interest

1982 Logie Awards (Australia) - Silver Logie for Best Supporting Actor in a Series: The Sullivans

2012 Sorta Unofficial New Zealand Film Awards (The Moas) - Best Actor - Short Film: for Honk If You're Horny

2013 Show Me Shorts Film Festival (New Zealand) - Best Actor: for Honk if You're Horny

2013 Best Actors Film Festival (United States) - Best Actor - Short Comedy: for Honk if You're Horny

References

External links
 
 Official website
 AudioCulture profile

1947 births
AACTA Award winners
Australian male film actors
Australian male soap opera actors
Living people
Logie Award winners
New Zealand male film actors
New Zealand male soap opera actors
New Zealand male television actors
People from Lower Hutt
New Zealand musicians
Australian musicians
New Zealand emigrants to Australia
20th-century Australian male actors
20th-century New Zealand male actors
21st-century Australian male actors
21st-century New Zealand male actors